The 2009–10 Moldovan National Division was the 19th season of top-tier football in Moldova. The season began on 5 July 2008, with the final round of matches played on 16 May 2009. Sheriff Tiraspol retained their title as defending champions.

Team changes
On 6 June 2009, Tiligul-Tiras Tiraspol announced that the club would dissolve, citing a lack of funds as the reason. As a consequence, Academia Chișinău were spared from relegation. The 2008–09 season had already been absolved with only eleven teams after FC Politehnica Chișinău withdrew their participation just days before the scheduled start.

The two vacant league spots were filled with 2008–09 Moldovan "A" Division champions Viitorul Orhei and 11th-placed Sfîntul Gheorghe, who bought their way into the top level.

Stadia and locations

Managers and captains

League table

Results
The schedule consists of three rounds. During the first two rounds, each team played each other once home and away for a total of 22 matches. The pairings of the third round were then set according to the standings after the first two rounds, giving every team a third game against each opponent for a total of 33 games per team.

Official schedule

First and second round

Third round
Key numbers for pairing determination:

Top goalscorers

Hat-tricks

Clean sheets

Disciplinary

See also

2009–10 FC Academia UTM season
2009–10 CSCA-Rapid season
2009–10 FC Dacia season
2009–10 FC Dinamo Bender season
2009–10 FC Iskra-Stali season
2009–10 FC Nistru season
2009–10 FC Olimpia season
2009–10 FC Sfîntul Gheorghe season
2009–10 FC Sheriff season
2009–10 FC Tiraspol season
2009–10 FC Viitorul Orhei season
2009–10 FC Zimbru Chișinău season

References

External links
 Official page 
 Moldova.Sports 
 Statistic of the Season  

Moldovan Super Liga seasons
1
Moldova